The Maquis de Saint-Marcel was a force of French resistance fighters, 3000 men with 200 Free French SAS (Special Air Service), during World War II operating in Brittany, Morbihan. It was created just before the Normandy landings with the objectives of preventing  German army reinforcements from reaching the coast, thus facilitating the task of the allied landing forces.

The Maquis de Saint-Marcel lasted only a very short time. It had been infiltrated by German spies, allowing the Germans to attack it in an ambush on 18 June 1944. After it was dissolved, the remaining resistance fighters resumed contact without forming a new maquis.

See also 
 Paul Chenailler alias Colonel Morice
 Operation Dingson
 Operation Cooney
 Operation Lost
 Operation Samwest

History of Brittany
Saint-Marcel